The César Award for Best Adaptation is an award presented by the Académie des Arts et Techniques du Cinéma. It was initially awarded from 1983 to 1985, and then awarded again in 2006, when the original category (César Award for Best Writing) was split into two awards, the other being César Award for Best Original Screenplay.

Winners and nominees

1980s

The César Award for Best Writing was awarded from 1986 to 2005.

2000s

2010s

2020s

See also
César Award for Best Original Screenplay
César Award for Best Writing
Magritte Award for Best Screenplay
Academy Award for Best Adapted Screenplay
Academy Award for Best Original Screenplay
BAFTA Award for Best Adapted Screenplay
BAFTA Award for Best Original Screenplay

References

External links 
 Official website 
 César Award for Best Adaptation at AlloCiné

Adaptation
Screenwriting awards for film